β-Amylase (EC 3.2.1.2 , saccharogen amylase, glycogenase) is an enzyme with the systematic name 4-α-D-glucan maltohydrolase. It catalyses the following reaction:

 Hydrolysis of (1→4)-α-D-glucosidic linkages in polysaccharides so as to remove successive maltose units from the non-reducing ends of the chains

This enzyme acts on starch, glycogen and related polysaccharides and oligosaccharides producing beta-maltose by an inversion. Beta-amylase is found in bacteria, fungi, and plants; bacteria and cereal sources are the most heat stable.  Working from the non-reducing end, β-amylase catalyzes the hydrolysis of the second α-1,4 glycosidic bond, cleaving off two glucose units (maltose) at a time.  During the ripening of fruit, β-amylase breaks starch into maltose, resulting in the sweet flavor of ripe fruit.

β-amylase is present in an inactive form prior to seed germination. Many microbes also produce amylase to degrade extracellular starches.  Animal tissues do not contain β-amylase, although it may be present in microorganisms contained within the digestive tract. The optimum pH for β-amylase is 4.0–5.0 They belong to Glycoside hydrolase family 14.

See also 
 Amylase
 Alpha-amylase

References

Further reading

External links 
  "Amylase, Alpha" , I.U.B.: 3.2.1.11,4-α-D-Glucan glucanohydrolase. "Amylase, Alpha" , I.U.B.: 3.2.1.11,4-α-D-Glucan glucanohydrolase.

External links 
 

EC 3.2.1